Lewis Kennedy may refer to:

 Lewis Kennedy (d. 1743), gardener to John Russell, 4th Duke of Bedford at Woburn Estate, Bedfordshire
 Lewis Kennedy (d. 1782), Scottish nurseryman, co-founder of Lee and Kennedy's Vineyard Nursery at Hammersmith, London
 Lewis Kennedy (landscape designer) (1789–1877), designer of formal gardens at estates in England and France